Saint Stephen Seminary was a diocesan minor seminary staffed by the Sulpician Fathers in the diocese of Honolulu that closed in 1970.

The seminary land was founded in 1946 when the Diocese of Honolulu obtained the 22 acre (89,000 m2) estate of Harold K.L. Castle, which was built in 1927. It is located above Maunawili valley in the Koolaupoko district of the island of Oahu. It currently serves as the residence of the bishop of Honolulu. At its peak the seminary accommodated some 70 high school and college students from Guam, other Pacific Islands and the State of Hawaii.

The seminary flourished in the 1950s and '60s, but dwindled and closed in the early 1980s. After the seminary's closure, the Cullinan Building was transformed into a diocesan center housing various officers of the diocesan curia. Since the episcopate of Msgr. John Scanlan, the seminary grounds have also housed a Carmelite monastery of discalced nuns from Hong Kong.

Currently, candidates for priestly formation in the Diocese of Honolulu attend the metropolitan seminaries of Saint Joseph in Mountain View, California, and Saint Patrick in Menlo Park, California.

Notable faculty and alumni
Prior to his elevation to the episcopate as auxiliary bishop of Honolulu, Msgr. Joseph Ferrario, was a professor of Greek and Latin at Saint Stephen's.  Among his many students was Roman Catholic deacon and Hawaiian comedian, Frank Delima, known for his sardonic portrayal of a fictitious Roman prelate, Monsignor Vermicelli.

References

External links
Roman Catholic Diocese of Honolulu

Catholic seminaries in the United States
Seminaries and theological colleges in Hawaii
Private high schools in Hawaii
Schools in Honolulu County, Hawaii
Educational institutions established in 1946
Educational institutions disestablished in 1970
1946 establishments in Hawaii
Roman Catholic Diocese of Honolulu
1970 disestablishments in Hawaii